Pacific Peak, elevation , is a summit in the Mosquito Range of central Colorado. The peak is southwest of Breckenridge in the Arapaho National Forest. Its long east ridge is prominently visible across the valley to the north when hiking Quandary Peak, a popular 14er in Colorado. It is often hiked together with nearby Atlantic Peak. Pacific Tarn, the highest officially named lake in the United States, lies high on the eastern flank of the peak.

See also

List of Colorado mountain ranges
List of Colorado mountain summits
List of Colorado fourteeners
List of Colorado 4000 meter prominent summits
List of the most prominent summits of Colorado
List of Colorado county high points

References

External links

Mountains of Colorado
Mountains of Summit County, Colorado
North American 4000 m summits